Rappresentatione di anima et di corpo (Portrayal of the Soul and the Body) is a musical work by Emilio de' Cavalieri to a libretto by Agostino Manni (1548-1618). With it, Cavalieri regarded himself as the composer of the first opera or oratorio. Whether he was actually the first is subject to some academic debate, as is whether the work is better categorized as an opera or an oratorio. It was first performed in Rome in February 1600 in the Oratorio dei Filippini adjacent to the church of Santa Maria in Vallicella.

The first opera
It was imagined during the Renaissance, almost certainly incorrectly, that Greek drama was sung, not declaimed, and that therefore opera was a revival of ancient practice. On 10 November 1600 Emilio de Cavalieri wrote a letter arguing that he, not Jacopo Peri, was the true reviver of Greek style acting with singing, i.e. opera.  Peri later deferred to him in the preface to the published version of Euridice in 1601. (Euridice had received its first performance in October 1600). The music historian Joachim Steinheuer comments that Cavalieri was a pioneer of "recitation in singing or 'recitar cantando' "; this type of declamation was a major innovation in enabling the introduction of extended dramatic monologues and dialogues, as required in opera.

Since the Rappresentatione is fully staged, in three acts with a spoken prologue, it can be considered to be the earliest surviving opera.

Editions

There are modern editions of the "opera":  
Emilio de Cavalieri, (ed. Philip Thorby), Rappresentatione di anima et di corpo, (King's Music, 1994);
 the American Institute of Musicology, edition of 2007 (Modern score  & 1 vol. of Facsimiles and translations).

Recordings
 directed by Sergio Vartolo (Naxos 8.554096-97). 
 by the ensembles Magnificat and The Whole Noyse with Judith Nelson (Anima) and Paul Hillier (Corpo), CD label Koch;
 by Akademie für Alte Musik Berlin & Choeur de la Staatsoper de Berlin, conducted by René Jacobs; Cité de la Musique ® 2012 - Broadcast by ARTE;
 there is a video recording of a concert performance conducted by Lorenzo Tozzi with the Sinfonico Romano.
 Recorded in 2005 by ensemble L'Arpeggiata under the direction of Christina Pluhar on Alpha Productions (France) B0007VF21Y.
In 2003 at Ludwigsburg Festival the conductor Teodor Currentzis presented a concert performance of "Rappresentatione" in instrumentation and performance adaptation for 8 singers and 8 instruments by Alexander Shchetynsky.

References
Notes

Sources

 Murray C. Bradshaw, and Agostino Manni, Emilio de'Cavalieri, Rappresentatione di anima, et di corpo: 1600, (American Institute of Musicology, 2007). 
 H. Wiley Hitchcock: "Cavalieri, Emilio de'", Grove Music Online, ed. L. Macy (Accessed 4 July 2007), (subscription access)
 H. Wiley Hitchcock, "Cavalieri, Emilio"; also "Opera", "Intermedio", "Peri", "Rappresentatione". The New Grove Dictionary of Opera, (MacMillan, 1992).
 Composing opera from Dafne to Ulisse Errante, (translated Tim Carter), Practica musica No. 2 (Kraków : Musica Jagellonica, 1994). (English translations of prefaces to 17th-century Italian operas, by Rinuccini, Peri, Caccini; Marco da Gagliano, Cavalieri, Agazzari, Vitali, Mazzocchi, Ottavio Tronsarelli, Landi, Michelangelo Rossi, and Giacomo Badoaro. Includes Italian originals.)
 Steinheuer, Joachim (2007). "Orfeo (1607)", in The Cambridge Companion to Monteverdi, ed. J. Whenham and R. Wistreich, pp. 119–140. Cambridge: Cambridge University Press.

External links
 
 
 Libretto of the opera (in Italian).

1600 operas
Italian-language operas
Operas by Emilio de Cavalieri
Operas
Oratorios